Kodur is a census town and a suburb of Malappuram, India.

The Panchayat ruling party is UDF headed by Rabiya Karuvatil. Kodur covers about 19 wards. The Kodur panchayat office is located in the ward called Thanikkal. It belongs to North Kerala Division. It is located 5 km towards South from District head quarters Malappuram. 11 km from Mankada. 346 km from State capital Thiruvananthapuram. Kodur is part of Malappuram Assembly constituency as well as Malappuram (Lok Sabha constituency).

Schools
 GMLP School Kuttasserikulamba (East Kodur)
  PMSAMAHSS Chemmankadavu
  G.M.U.P School Chemmankadavu
  A.M.L.P School Valiyad
  GMLP School Peringottupualm
  AMUP School Ummathoor
  Cattiparambu LP School
  LP School Palakkal
  Buds School Chemmankadavu
  AMUP School Mangattupulam
  LP School West Kodur
  PKM UP School Alpattakulamba.
 A.M.L.P SCHOOL CHOLAKKAL
 A.M.L.P SCHOOL Pattuparakulamba

Auditoriums
 Rose Lounge, Nooradi palam, Vadakemanna.
 Malayil Auditorium, Cheloor. 
 Mylanchi Dharbar Auditorium, Chemmankadavu
 LIMRA Conventional Center Chattipparamba
Orenge valiyad

Famous Football Clubs
 Youth F.C Arts & Sports Club Alppattakulamba
 Regency Club Ottathara 
 Gunners FC Ottahara
 RIVAL_Arts&Sports Club Palakkal
 BSC Thanikkal
 Boys Muttipalam
 Osca Thanikkal
 Masc Mangattupulam
 Friends Mangattupulam
 Kask Muttipalam
 Young Challengers NK padi
 Chosaka Chemmankadavu
 Nisari Chemmankadavu
 Moulana Puliyattukulam
 Al-Madhar Puliyattukulam
 Karma Kundaas Kareeparambu
 Star Boys East Kodur
 Town Team EastKodur
 udayam kareeparamba
 Young star fc ummathoor
 Veganza Arts and Sports club Mythrinagar
 suru padi padinjrarakara
 Town Team Westkodur
 FC Pilapadi
 TOWN TEAM PARAKKAL Arts and Sports club

Places
 Palakkal
 Thanikkal
 Chelur
 Valiyad
 Chemmankadavu
 East Kodur
 West Kodur
 varikkode
 NK Padi 
 Ottathara
 Vadakemanna
 Puliyatukulam
 Alpattakulamba
 Kareeparambu
 Mangattupulam

Hospitals
 Health Center
 Ayurvedic Hospital

Demographics
 India census, Kodur had a population of 33790 with 16534 males and 17256 females.

Railway
There is no railway station near to Kodur in less than 10 km. However Kozhikode Rail Way Station is major railway station 47 km near to Kodur.
Angadipuram at 16 km on Shoranur-Nilambur line is the nearest railway station thou with limited services and Tirur at 22 km is the nearest railway station with major services and stops for most long route trains.

Banks
 Kodur urban Co-operative Rural Bank westKodur
 Co operative bank Valiyad
Kerala Gramin Bank Thanikkal
 Co operative bank Chemmankadavu
 Co operative bank Nooradi
 Co operative bank Ummathoor
 Co operative bank West Kodur

Government Offices
 Panchayath Office Thanikkal
 Public Health Center Thanikkal
 Agriculture Office Thanikkal
 Post Office Chemmankadavu
 Village Office Chemmankadavu

Anganwadies in Kodur
There are 30 Anganwadies in Kodur.

 Peringottupulam 
 Paruvamanna 
 Ummathoor 
 Valiyaparambu 
 Mundakkodu 
 Chattiparambu 
 Chemmankadavu
 Parammal
 Cheloor
 Valiyad
 Thanikkal
 Alppatakulambu
 Alpattakulamba- Padinjarekara
 Parerangadi
 Puliyattukulam
 Mangattupulam
 Kareeparambu
 N.K Paddi
 Urdu Nagar
 West Kodur
Arakkalpadi-parengal

References

Suburbs of Malappuram
Cities and towns in Malappuram district